Mountain High School (formerly Mountain School) is a high school in Mountain, Oconto County, Wisconsin. It is listed on the National Register of Historic Places as Mountain School in 2000.  It has also been known as Mountain Union Free High School and as State Graded School.

A three-story red brick high school built in 1905 at 14330 Highway W West, it was built in three phases, in 1905, 1914, and 1961. It served elementary school students until 2003.

See also
National Register of Historic Places in Oconto County, Wisconsin

References

School buildings on the National Register of Historic Places in Wisconsin
School buildings completed in 1905
Oconto County, Wisconsin
High schools in Wisconsin
1905 establishments in Wisconsin